

32001–32100 

|-
| 32001 Golbin ||  || Benjamin David Golbin (born 1998) was awarded second place in the 2015 Intel International Science and Engineering Fair for his plant sciences team project. || 
|-id=002
| 32002 Gorokhovsky ||  || Elliot Gorokhovsky (born 1999) was awarded first place in the 2015 Intel International Science and Engineering Fair for his systems software project. || 
|-id=005
| 32005 Roberthalfon ||  || Robert Z. Halfon (born 1998) was awarded second place in the 2015 Intel International Science and Engineering Fair for his environmental engineering project || 
|-id=006
| 32006 Hallisey ||  || Olivia Anne Hallisey (born 1998) was awarded first place in the 2015 Intel International Science and Engineering Fair for her biomedical and health sciences project. || 
|-id=007
| 32007 Amirhelmy ||  || Amir Helmy (born 2001) was awarded second place in the 2015 Intel International Science and Engineering Fair for his systems software project. || 
|-id=008
| 32008 Adriángalád ||  || Adrián Galád (born 1970), an astronomer and discoverer of minor planets at Modra and Ondřejov observatories who has (co-)authored a number of papers on asteroid photometric observations and orbital integrations. || 
|-id=014
| 32014 Bida ||  || Thomas A. Bida (born 1959), an instrument scientist at Lowell Observatory. || 
|-id=018
| 32018 Robhenning ||  || Robert Cole Henning (born 1997) was awarded second place in the 2015 Intel International Science and Engineering Fair for his embedded systems project. || 
|-id=019
| 32019 Krithikaiyer ||  || Krithika Iyer (born 1999) was awarded second place in the 2015 Intel International Science and Engineering Fair for her math project. || 
|-id=021
| 32021 Lilyjenkins ||  || Lily Nalulani Jenkins (born 1999) was awarded first place in the 2015 Intel International Science and Engineering Fair for her earth and environmental sciences team project. || 
|-id=022
| 32022 Sarahjenkins ||  || Sarah 'Alohilani Jenkins (born 1997) was awarded first place in the 2015 Intel International Science and Engineering Fair for her earth and environmental sciences team project. || 
|-id=025
| 32025 Karanjerath ||  || Karan Jerath (born 1996) was awarded best of category award and first place in the 2015 Intel ISEF for his environmental engineering project. He also received the Intel Foundation Young Scientist Award and the Science & Technology Forum Visit to India. || 
|-id=031
| 32031 Joyjin ||  || Joy Qiu Jin (born 1997) was awarded second place in the 2015 Intel International Science and Engineering Fair for her biomedical and health sciences project. || 
|-id=032
| 32032 Askandola ||  || Anmolpreet Singh Kandola (born 1997) was awarded second place in the 2015 Intel International Science and Engineering Fair for his animal sciences project. || 
|-id=033
| 32033 Arjunkapoor ||  || Arjun Kapoor (born 1997) was awarded second place in the 2015 Intel International Science and Engineering Fair for his systems software team project || 
|-id=034
| 32034 Sophiakorner ||  || Sophia Nicole Korner (born 1999) was awarded best of category award and first place in the 2015 Intel ISEF for her behavioral and social sciences team project. She also received the Intel Foundation Cultural and Scientific Visit to China Award. || 
|-id=037
| 32037 Deepikakurup ||  || Deepika Saraswathy Kurup (born 1998) was awarded second place in the 2015 Intel International Science and Engineering Fair for her environmental engineering project. || 
|-id=038
| 32038 Kwiecinski ||  || Jarek Kwiecinski (born 2000) was awarded second place in the 2015 Intel International Science and Engineering Fair for his earth and environmental sciences project. || 
|-id=044
| 32044 Lakmazaheri ||  || Ava Carmen Lakmazaheri (born 1998) was awarded best of category award and first place in the 2015 Intel ISEF for her robotics and intelligent machines project. She also received the Philip V. Streich Memorial Award. || 
|-id=047
| 32047 Wenjiali ||  || Wenjia Dara Li (born 1998) was awarded second place in the 2015 Intel International Science and Engineering Fair for her plant sciences team project. || 
|-id=048
| 32048 Kathyliu ||  || Kathy Liu (born 1998) was awarded best of category award and first place in the 2015 Intel ISEF for her energy project. She also received the Intel Foundation Cultural and Scientific Visit to China Award. || 
|-id=049
| 32049 Jonathanma ||  || Jonathan QuanXuan Ma (born 1998) was awarded second place in the 2015 Intel International Science and Engineering Fair for his computational biology and bioinformatics team project. || 
|-id=051
| 32051 Sadhikamalladi ||  || Sadhika S. Malladi (born 1998) was awarded second place in the 2015 Intel International Science and Engineering Fair for her computational biology and bioinformatics team project. || 
|-id=052
| 32052 Diyamathur ||  || Diya Mathur (born 1998) was awarded best of category award and first place in the 2015 Intel ISEF for her behavioral and social sciences team project. She also received the Intel Foundation Cultural and Scientific Visit to China Award. || 
|-id=053
| 32053 Demetrimaxim ||  || Demetri Maxim (born 1998) was awarded best of category award and first place in the 2015 Intel International Science and Engineering Fair for his cellular and molecular biology project. || 
|-id=054
| 32054 Musunuri ||  || Sriharshita Vani Musunuri (born 2000) was awarded best of category award and first place in the 2015 Intel ISEF for her energy project. She also received the Innovation Exploration Award. || 
|-id=056
| 32056 Abrarnadroo ||  || Abrar Ali Nadroo (born 1997) was awarded second place in the 2015 Intel International Science and Engineering Fair for his biochemistry project. || 
|-id=057
| 32057 Ethannovek ||  || Ethan Novek (born 1999) was awarded first place in the 2015 Intel International Science and Engineering Fair for his energy project. || 
|-id=058
| 32058 Charlesnoyes ||  || Charles Noyes (born 1999) was awarded best of category award and first place in the 2015 Intel ISEF for his systems software project. He also received the London International Youth Science Forum, Philip V. Streich Memorial Award. || 
|-id=059
| 32059 Ruchipandya ||  || Ruchi Sandeep Pandya (born 1997) was awarded second place in the 2015 Intel International Science and Engineering Fair for her chemistry project. || 
|-id=060
| 32060 Wyattpontius ||  || Wyatt Martin Pontius (born 1998) was awarded first place in the 2015 Intel International Science and Engineering Fair for his materials science team project || 
|-id=062
| 32062 Amolpunjabi ||  || Amol Punjabi (born 1998) was awarded best of category award and first place in the 2015 Intel ISEF for his biochemistry project. He also received the Intel and Indo-US Science & Technology Forum Visit to India. || 
|-id=063
| 32063 Pusapaty ||  || Sai Sameer Pusapaty (born 1999) was awarded second place in the 2015 Intel International Science and Engineering Fair for his environmental engineering project. || 
|-id=065
| 32065 Radulovacki ||  || Reid W. Radulovacki (born 1998) was awarded second place in the 2015 Intel International Science and Engineering Fair for his biomedical and health sciences project. || 
|-id=066
| 32066 Ramayya ||  || Shreya Sundaresh Ramayya (born 1997) was awarded first place in the 2015 Intel International Science and Engineering Fair for her chemistry project. || 
|-id=067
| 32067 Ranganathan ||  || Noopur Ranganathan (born 1999) was awarded second place in the 2015 Intel International Science and Engineering Fair for her behavioral and social sciences project. || 
|-id=069
| 32069 Mayarao ||  || Maya Rao (born 1996) was awarded second place in the 2015 Intel International Science and Engineering Fair for her earth and environmental sciences project. || 
|-id=070
| 32070 Michaelretchin ||  || Michael Retchin (born 1997) was awarded best of category award and first place in the 2015 Intel ISEF for his computational biology and bioinformatics team project. He also received the Intel and Indo-US Science & Technology Forum Visit to India. || 
|-id=071
| 32071 Matthewretchin ||  || Matthew Retchin (born 1997) was awarded best of category award and first place in the 2015 Intel ISEF for his computational biology and bioinformatics team project. He also received the Intel and Indo-US Science & Technology Forum Visit to India. || 
|-id=072
| 32072 Revanur ||  || Swetha Revanur (born 1998) was awarded first place in the 2015 Intel International Science and Engineering Fair for her computational biology and bioinformatics project. || 
|-id=073
| 32073 Cassidyryan ||  || Cassidy Ryan (born 1997) was awarded second place in the 2015 Intel International Science and Engineering Fair for her earth and environmental sciences project. || 
|-id=074
| 32074 Kevinsadhu ||  || Kevin Sadhu (born 1998) was awarded second place in the 2015 Intel International Science and Engineering Fair for his biochemistry team project. || 
|-id=078
| 32078 Jamesavoldelli ||  || James Savoldelli (born 1998) was awarded first place in the 2015 Intel International Science and Engineering Fair for his environmental engineering team project. || 
|-id=079
| 32079 Hughsavoldelli ||  || Hugh Savoldelli (born 1998) was awarded first place in the 2015 Intel International Science and Engineering Fair for his environmental engineering team project. || 
|-id=080
| 32080 Sanashareef ||  || Sana Shareef (born 2000) was awarded second place in the 2015 Intel International Science and Engineering Fair for her animal sciences project. || 
|-id=082
| 32082 Sominsky ||  || Levy Aaron Sominsky (born 1998) was awarded second place in the 2015 Intel International Science and Engineering Fair for his plant sciences team project. || 
|-id=085
| 32085 Tomback ||  || Drew Tomback (born 1998) was awarded first place in the 2015 Intel International Science and Engineering Fair for his environmental engineering team project. || 
|-id=086
| 32086 Viviannetu ||  || Vivianne Tu (born 1997) was awarded second place in the 2015 Intel International Science and Engineering Fair for her physics and astronomy team project. || 
|-id=087
| 32087 Vemulapalli ||  || Anoop Vemulapalli (born 1997) was awarded second place in the 2015 Intel International Science and Engineering Fair for his plant sciences team project. || 
|-id=088
| 32088 Liamwallace ||  || Liam Alexander Wallace (born 1997) was awarded first place in the 2015 Intel International Science and Engineering Fair for his materials science team project. || 
|-id=089
| 32089 Wojtania ||  || Nicky Wojtania (born 1999) was awarded second place in the 2015 Intel International Science and Engineering Fair for her materials science project. || 
|-id=090
| 32090 Craigworley ||  || Craig Worley (born 1997) was awarded second place in the 2015 Intel International Science and Engineering Fair for his energy project. || 
|-id=091
| 32091 Jasonwu ||  || Jason Wu (born 1999) was awarded second place in the 2015 Intel International Science and Engineering Fair for his biomedical and health sciences project. || 
|-id=092
| 32092 Brianxia ||  || Brian Xia (born 2000) was awarded second place in the 2015 Intel International Science and Engineering Fair for his animal sciences project. || 
|-id=093
| 32093 Zhengyan ||  || Zheng Yan (born 1997) was awarded second place in the 2015 Intel International Science and Engineering Fair for his biomedical and health sciences project. || 
|-id=096
| 32096 Puckett ||  || Tim Puckett (born 1962), an American astronomer who built the Puckett Observatory in Elijay, Georgia, for cometary studies and supernova discovery. His team has over 75 supernova discoveries to its credit (Src). || 
|}

32101–32200 

|-
| 32101 Williamyin ||  || William Yin (born 1999) was awarded second place in the 2015 Intel International Science and Engineering Fair for his materials science project. || 
|-id=103
| 32103 Reʼemsari ||  || Reʼem Sari (born 1971) is an astrophysicist at the Hebrew University in Jerusalem, recognized for studying gamma-ray bursts, planet formation, the Kuiper belt, internal structure of asteroids, and evolution of binary systems. || 
|-id=107
| 32107 Ylitalo ||  || Maxwell Robert Ylitalo (born 1998) was awarded second place in the 2015 Intel International Science and Engineering Fair for his energy project. || 
|-id=108
| 32108 Jovanzhang ||  || Jovan Y. Zhang (born 1998) was awarded second place in the 2015 Intel International Science and Engineering Fair for his energy project. || 
|-id=120
| 32120 Stevezheng ||  || Steve Daikai Zheng (born 1996) was awarded second place in the 2015 Intel International Science and Engineering Fair for his environmental engineering project. || 
|-id=121
| 32121 Joshuazhou ||  || Joshua Zhou (born 1999) was awarded best of category award and first place in the 2015 Intel ISEF for his earth and environmental sciences project. He also received the Intel Foundation Cultural and Scientific Visit to China Award. || 
|-id=128
| 32128 Jayzussman ||  || Jay Wolf Zussman (born 1997) was awarded second place in the 2015 Intel International Science and Engineering Fair for his cellular and molecular biology project. || 
|-id=131
| 32131 Ravindran ||  || Pavithran T. Ravindran (born 1997) was awarded second place in the 2015 Intel International Science and Engineering Fair for his chemistry project. || 
|-id=132
| 32132 Andrewamini ||  || Andrew Ethridge Amini (born 1998), a finalist in the 2016 Intel Science Talent Search, a science competition for high school seniors, for his computational biology and bioinformatics project. || 
|-id=145
| 32145 Katberman ||  || Katharine Barr Berman (born 1998), a finalist in the 2016 Intel Science Talent Search, a science competition for high school seniors, for her cellular and molecular biology project. || 
|-id=146
| 32146 Paigebrown ||  || Paige Brown (born 1998), a finalist in the 2016 Intel Science Talent Search, a science competition for high school seniors, for her environmental science project. || 
|-id=151
| 32151 Seanmarshall ||  || Sean Marshall (born 1987) is a postdoctoral research scientist at Arecibo Observatory in Puerto Rico, USA. He studies near-Earth asteroids using radar and lightcurve observations to find their sizes, shapes, and rotation states, adding infrared observations to find their thermal properties. || 
|-id=163
| 32163 Claireburch ||  || Claire Bernadette Burch (born 1998), a finalist in the 2016 Intel Science Talent Search, a science competition for high school seniors, for her space science project. || 
|-id=184
| 32184 Yamaura ||  || Yuichi Yamaura (born 1955), a Japanese scientist and one of the leaders of the National Space Development Agency of Japan. He contributed greatly to the construction of the Bisei Spaceguard Center. || 
|-id=200
| 32200 Seiicyoshida ||  || Seiichi Yoshida (born 1974), a Japanese astronomer who started the MISAO (Multitudinous Image-based Sky-survey and Accumulative Observations) project. He has contributed to the discovery of variable stars and studies photometric observations of comets. || 
|}

32201–32300 

|-id=207
| 32207 Mairepercy ||  || Maire Percy (born 1939) conducts research at the University of Toronto in risk factors for human disease. She identifies factors that could lead to the cure or prevention of human disorders, including diabetes, Alzheimer's disease and Alzheimer-like dementia in Down Syndrome. She is the wife of astronomer John R. Percy  (Src). || 
|-id=208
| 32208 Johnpercy ||  || John R. Percy (born 1941), a British-born professor of astronomy and astrophysics at the University of Toronto, has written over 400 scientific papers, articles and books on variable stars and astronomy education. His organizational affiliations span the globe, and his many awards reflect his dedicated support to astronomy education. (Src). || 
|-id=213
| 32213 Joshuachoe ||  || Joshua Choe (born 1998), a finalist in the 2016 Intel Science Talent Search, a science competition for high school seniors, for his cellular and molecular biology project. || 
|-id=214
| 32214 Colburn ||  || Thomas William Colburn (born 1998), a finalist in the 2016 Intel Science Talent Search, a science competition for high school seniors, for his chemistry project. || 
|-id=217
| 32217 Beverlyge ||  || Beverly Ge (born 1998), a finalist in the 2016 Intel Science Talent Search, a science competition for high school seniors, for her materials science project. || 
|-id=222
| 32222 Charlesvest ||  || Charles M. Vest (1941–2013), was an American educator and engineer who served as president of the Massachusetts Institute of Technology (MIT) from 1990 to 2004. || 
|-id=226
| 32226 Vikulgupta ||  || Vikul Gupta (born 1998), a finalist in the 2016 Intel Science Talent Search, a science competition for high school seniors, for his computer science project. || 
|-id=229
| 32229 Higashino ||  || Soon il Junko Higashino (born 1998), a finalist in the 2016 Intel Science Talent Search, a science competition for high school seniors, for her animal sciences project. || 
|-id=233
| 32233 Georgehou ||  || George Hou (born 1998), a finalist in the 2016 Intel Science Talent Search, a science competition for high school seniors, for his mathematics project. || 
|-id=234
| 32234 Jesslihuang ||  || Jessica Li Huang (born 1998), a finalist in the 2016 Intel Science Talent Search, a science competition for high school seniors, for her behavioral and social sciences project. || 
|-id=237
| 32237 Jagadeesan ||  || Meena Jagadeesan (born 1998), a finalist in the 2016 Intel Science Talent Search, a science competition for high school seniors, for her mathematics project. || 
|-id=242
| 32242 Jagota ||  || Milind Jagota (born 1998), a finalist in the 2016 Intel Science Talent Search, a science competition for high school seniors, for his materials science project. || 
|-id=250
| 32250 Karthik ||  || Anjini Karthik (born 1998), a finalist in the 2016 Intel Science Talent Search, a science competition for high school seniors, for her materials science project. || 
|-id=260
| 32260 Schult ||  || Carsten Schult (born 1987) is a German atmospheric physicist who specializes in radar measurements of meteors for atmospheric and astronomical studies at the Leibniz-Institute of Atmospheric Physics in Kühlungsborn, Germany. || 
|-id=263
| 32263 Kusnierkiewicz ||  || David Yan Kusnierkiewicz (born 1955) served as mission systems engineer of the New Horizons Pluto Kuiper Belt mission. In this role he is making a fundamental contribution to the exploration of the solar system. || 
|-id=264
| 32264 Cathjesslai ||  || Catherine Jessica Yihui Lai (born 1998), a finalist in the 2016 Intel Science Talent Search, a science competition for high school seniors, for her medicine and health project. || 
|-id=267
| 32267 Hermannweyl ||  || Hermann Weyl (1885–1955) was a German-American pure and applied mathematician. His work, from the study of the Riemann surface to the application of group theory to quantum mechanics, shows his ability to find connections between previously unrelated subjects. || 
|-id=270
| 32270 Inokuchihiroo ||  || Hiroo Inokuchi (1927–2014) was a Japanese physicist who discovered the semiconductive properties in organic materials. He also contributed to the cultivation and development of research under microgravity. He is the chairman of Japan Space Forum, which manages Bisei Spaceguard Center. || 
|-id=272
| 32272 Hasegawayuya ||  || Yuya Hasegawa, the prizewinner in the 2008 Space Day Award || 
|-id=275
| 32275 Limichael ||  || Michael Yifan Li (born 1998), a finalist in the 2016 Intel Science Talent Search, a science competition for high school seniors, for his computational biology and bioinformatics project. || 
|-id=276
| 32276 Allenliu ||  || Allen Liu (born 1999), a finalist in the 2016 Intel Science Talent Search, a science competition for high school seniors, for his mathematics project. || 
|-id=277
| 32277 Helenliu ||  || Helen Liu (born 1998), a finalist in the 2016 Intel Science Talent Search, a science competition for high school seniors, for her medicine and health project. || 
|-id=278
| 32278 Makaram ||  || Yashaswini Makaram (born 1998), a finalist in the 2016 Intel Science Talent Search, a science competition for high school seniors, for her computer science project. || 
|-id=279
| 32279 Marshall ||  || Nathan Charles Marshall (born 1998) is a finalist in the 2016 Intel Science Talent Search, a science competition for high school seniors, for his earth and planetary science project. He attends the Boise High School, Boise, Idaho. || 
|-id=280
| 32280 Rachelmashal ||  || Rachel Mashal (born 1998), a finalist in the 2016 Intel Science Talent Search, a science competition for high school seniors, for her animal sciences project. || 
|-id=281
| 32281 Shreyamenon ||  || Shreya Menon (born 1998), a finalist in the 2016 Intel Science Talent Search, a science competition for high school seniors, for her cellular and molecular biology project. || 
|-id=282
| 32282 Arnoldmong ||  || Arnold Mong (born 1998), a finalist in the 2016 Intel Science Talent Search, a science competition for high school seniors, for his physics project. || 
|-id=288
| 32288 Terui ||  || Yoshihiro Terui, the winner of the 2008 Space Day Award essay competition || 
|-id=294
| 32294 Zajonc ||  ||  (born 1933), Czech zoologist and amateur astronomer, chair of the Nitra branch of the Slovak Union of Amateur Astronomers (SZAA), a member of the Jihlava Astronomical Society, and honorary fellow of the Slovak Astronomical Society || 
|-id=295
| 32295 Ravichandran ||  || Kavya Ravichandran (born 1998), a finalist in the 2016 Intel Science Talent Search, a science competition for high school seniors, for her bioengineering project. || 
|-id=296
| 32296 Aninsayana ||  || Anin Sayana (born 1998), a finalist in the 2016 Intel Science Talent Search, a science competition for high school seniors, for his medicine and health project. || 
|-id=298
| 32298 Kunalshroff ||  || Kunal Shroff (born 1998), a finalist in the 2016 Intel Science Talent Search (STS), a science competition for high school seniors, for his cellular and molecular biology project. || 
|-id=299
| 32299 Srinivas ||  || Pranav Srinivas (born 1998), a finalist in the 2016 Intel Science Talent Search, a science competition for high school seniors, for his computational biology and bioinformatics project. || 
|-id=300
| 32300 Uwamanzunna ||  || Augusta Uwamanzu-Nna (born 1998), a finalist in the 2016 Intel Science Talent Search, a science competition for high school seniors, for her engineering project. || 
|}

32301–32400 

|-id=302
| 32302 Mayavarma ||  || Maya Varma (born 1998), a finalist in the 2016 Intel Science Talent Search, a science competition for high school seniors, for her engineering project || 
|-id=308
| 32308 Sreyavemuri ||  || Sreya Vemuri (born 1998), a finalist in the 2016 Intel Science Talent Search, a science competition for high school seniors, for her physics project. || 
|-id=310
| 32310 Asherwillner ||  || Asher Justin Willner (born 1998), a finalist in the 2016 Intel Science Talent Search, a science competition for high school seniors, for his engineering project. || 
|-id=311
| 32311 Josephineyu ||  || Josephine Jessica Yu (born 1998), a finalist in the 2016 Intel Science Talent Search, a science competition for high school seniors, for her physics project. || 
|-id=313
| 32313 Zhangmichael ||  || Michael Zhang (born 1998), a finalist in the 2016 Intel Science Talent Search, a science competition for high school seniors, for his bioengineering project. || 
|-id=314
| 32314 Rachelzhang ||  || Rachel Zhang (born 1998), a finalist in the 2016 Intel Science Talent Search, a science competition for high school seniors, for her mathematics project. || 
|-id=315
| 32315 Clarezhu ||  || Clare Zhu, (born 1998), a finalist in the 2016 Intel Science Talent Search, a science competition for high school seniors, for her computational biochemistry project || 
|-id=379
| 32379 Markadame ||  || Mark Adame, a mentor of a finalist in the 2016 Intel Science Talent Search (STS), a science competition for high school seniors. || 
|-id=381
| 32381 Bellomo ||  || Vickie Bellomo, a mentor of a finalist in the 2016 Intel Science Talent Search (STS), a science competition for high school seniors. || 
|-id=384
| 32384 Scottbest ||  || Scott Best, a mentor of a finalist in the 2016 Intel Science Talent Search (STS), a science competition for high school seniors. || 
|-id=387
| 32387 D'Egidio ||  || Michael D´Egidio, a mentor of a finalist in the 2016 Intel Science Talent Search (STS), a science competition for high school seniors. || 
|-id=389
| 32389 Michflannory ||  || Michelle Flannory, a mentor of a finalist in the 2016 Intel Science Talent Search (STS), a science competition for high school seniors. || 
|-id=393
| 32393 Galinato ||  || Erin Galinato, a mentor of a finalist in the 2016 Intel Science Talent Search (STS), a science competition for high school seniors. || 
|-id=400
| 32400 Itaparica ||  || The Observatório Astronômico do Sertão de Itaparica (OASI) is located in Itacuruba (PE) and is dedicated to the study of small Solar System studies. Its 1-m telescope, in operation since 2011, is the largest one in the northeastern region of Brazil. || 
|}

32401–32500 

|-id=405
| 32405 Jameshill ||  || James Hill, a mentor of a finalist in the 2016 Intel Science Talent Search (STS), a science competition for high school seniors. || 
|-id=406
| 32406 Tracyhughes ||  || Tracy Hughes, a mentor of a finalist in the 2016 Intel Science Talent Search (STS), a science competition for high school seniors. || 
|-id=424
| 32424 Caryjames ||  || Cary James, a mentor of a finalist in the 2016 Intel Science Talent Search (STS), a science competition for high school seniors. || 
|-id=428
| 32428 Peterlangley ||  || Peter Langley, a mentor of a finalist in the 2016 Intel Science Talent Search (STS), a science competition for high school seniors. || 
|-id=436
| 32436 Eranofek ||  || Eran O. Ofek (born 1972), is an Israeli astrophysicist and a discoverer of minor planets at the Weizmann Institute of Science who studies transient phenomena on the outskirts of the Solar System. || 
|-id=449
| 32449 Crystalmiller ||  || Crystal Miller, a mentor of a finalist in the 2016 Intel Science Talent Search (STS), a science competition for high school seniors. || 
|-id=453I
| 32453 Kanamishogo ||  || Kanami Yoshimi and Shogo Yoshimi are the discoverer's daughter and son || 
|-id=462
| 32462 Janmitchener ||  || Jan Mitchener, a mentor of a finalist in the 2016 Intel Science Talent Search (STS), a science competition for high school seniors. || 
|}

32501–32600 

|-id=522
| 32522 Judiepersons ||  || Judie Persons, a mentor of a finalist in the 2016 Intel Science Talent Search (STS), a science competition for high school seniors. || 
|-id=527
| 32527 Junko ||  || Junko Baba (born 1978) is an administrative associate at the National Astronomical Observatory of Japan. She has organized international collaborative programs promoting studies of asteroids in Uzbekistan, South Korea, Taiwan, and Japan. || 
|-id=531
| 32531 Ulrikababiaková ||  || Ulrika Babiaková (1976–2002), Slovak astronomer, was interested in interplanetary matter and asteroid photometry, as well as teaching and the popularization of astronomy. She was the wife of the discoverer and died in an accident aged 26. || 
|-id=532
| 32532 Thereus ||  || Thereus, mythological centaur, a hunter who captured bears and carried them home, alive and struggling || 
|-id=533
| 32533 Tranpham ||  || Tran Pham, a mentor of a finalist in the 2016 Intel Science Talent Search, a science competition for high school seniors. || 
|-id=544
| 32544 Debjaniroy ||  || Debjani Roy, a mentor of a finalist in the 2016 Intel Science Talent Search (STS), a science competition for high school seniors. || 
|-id=547
| 32547 Shandroff ||  || Melissa Shandroff, a mentor of a finalist in the 2016 Intel Science Talent Search (STS), a science competition for high school seniors. || 
|-id=549
| 32549 Taricco ||  || Angela Taricco, a mentor of a finalist in the 2016 Intel Science Talent Search (STS), a science competition for high school seniors. || 
|-id=550
| 32550 Sharonthomas ||  || Sharon Thomas, a mentor of a finalist in the 2016 Intel Science Talent Search (STS), a science competition for high school seniors. || 
|-id=552
| 32552 Jennithomas ||  || Jennifer Thomas, a mentor of a finalist in the 2016 Intel Science Talent Search (STS), a science competition for high school seniors. || 
|-id=556
| 32556 Jennivibber ||  || Jennifer Vibber, a mentor of a finalist in the 2016 Intel Science Talent Search (STS), a science competition for high school seniors. || 
|-id=561
| 32561 Waldron ||  || Melissa Waldron, a mentor of a finalist in the 2016 Intel Science Talent Search (STS), a science competition for high school seniors. || 
|-id=562
| 32562 Caseywarner ||  || Casey Warner, a mentor of a finalist in the 2016 Intel Science Talent Search (STS), a science competition for high school seniors. || 
|-id=563
| 32563 Nicolezaidi ||  || Nicole Zaidi, a mentor of a finalist in the 2016 Intel Science Talent Search (STS), a science competition for high school seniors. || 
|-id=564
| 32564 Glass ||  || Eugene Glass, American amateur astronomer || 
|-id=569
| 32569 Deming ||  || Leo Deming, American amateur astronomer, one of the founders of the original observatory at Rose-Hulman (the discovery site) || 
|-id=570
| 32570 Peruindiana ||  || The "circus capital of the world" Peru, Indiana, hometown of the American discoverer Chris Wolfe || 
|-id=571
| 32571 Brayton ||  || Scott Brayton, American car racer || 
|-id=579
| 32579 Allendavia ||  || Davia Elizabeth LeXin Allen (born 2002), a finalist in the 2016 Broadcom MASTERS, a math and science competition for middle school students, for her animal science project. || 
|-id=580
| 32580 Avbalasingam ||  || Akhilesh Varadan Balasingam (born 2003), a finalist in the 2016 Broadcom MASTERS, a math and science competition for middle school students, for his energy and sustainability project. || 
|-id=582
| 32582 Mayachandar ||  || Maya Sruti Chandar (born 2003), a finalist in the 2016 Broadcom MASTERS, a math and science competition for middle school students, for her animal science project. || 
|-id=590
| 32590 Cynthiachen ||  || Cynthia Chen (born 2002), a finalist in the 2016 Broadcom MASTERS, a math and science competition for middle school students, for her environmental and earth sciences project. || 
|-id=593
| 32593 Crotty ||  || Brendan Joseph Crotty (born 2002), a finalist in the 2016 Broadcom MASTERS, a math and science competition for middle school students, for his materials & bioengineering project. || 
|-id=594
| 32594 Nathandeng ||  || Nathan K. Deng (born 2002), a finalist in the 2016 Broadcom MASTERS, a math and science competition for middle school students, for his chemistry project. || 
|-id=596
| 32596 Čepek ||  || Aleš Čepek (born 1954) is a professor at the Department of Mapping and Cartography, Faculty of Civil Engineering of the Czech Technical University in Prague. He is the author of project GNU Gama and the editor-in-chief of Geoinformatics FCE CTU Journal. || 
|}

32601–32700 

|-id=603
| 32603 Ariaeppinger ||  || Aria Rosalee Eppinger (born 2001), a finalist in the 2016 Broadcom MASTERS, a math and science competition for middle school students, for her medicine and health sciences project. || 
|-id=605
| 32605 Lucy ||  || Lucy, nickname of AL 288-1, the 3.2 million years old, 40-percent-complete Australopithecus afarensis skeleton discovered in 1974 by the International Afar Research Expedition in the Awash Valley of Ethiopia's Afar Depression || 
|-id=608
| 32608 Hallas ||  || Tony Hallas (born 1945) trained as a professional photographer and is one of the finest astroimagers. His photographs have appeared in books, magazines, and on products such as Apple's OS-X Lion operating system. He developed many imageprocessing techniques, which he has shared in articles and on DVDs. || 
|-id=609
| 32609 Jamesfagan ||  || James Dana Fagan (born 2006), a finalist in the 2016 Broadcom MASTERS, a math and science competition for middle school students, for his physics project || 
|-id=610
| 32610 Siennafink ||  || Sienna Nicole Fink (born 2002), a finalist in the 2016 Broadcom MASTERS, a math and science competition for middle school students, for her physics project. || 
|-id=611
| 32611 Ananyaganesh ||  || Ananya Lakshmi Ganesh (born 2001), a finalist in the 2016 Broadcom MASTERS, a math and science competition for middle school students, for her medicine and health sciences project. || 
|-id=612
| 32612 Ghatare ||  || Adishree Ghatare (born 2002), a finalist in the 2016 Broadcom MASTERS, a math and science competition for middle school students, for her computer science and software engineering project. || 
|-id=613
| 32613 Tseyuenman ||  || Tse Yuen Man Joanna (1968–2003) was a Respiratory Medicine specialist doctor in Hong Kong. She died on duty while serving patients during the SARS epidemics in 2003. Her bravery and kindness as a physician has touched the hearts of many people. || 
|-id=614
| 32614 Hacegarcia ||  || Joaquin Hace Garcia (born 2002), a finalist in the 2016 Broadcom MASTERS, a math and science competition for middle school students, for his electrical and mechanical engineering project. || 
|-id=616
| 32616 Nadinehan ||  || Nadine Han (born 2003), a finalist in the 2016 Broadcom MASTERS, a math and science competition for middle school students, for her environmental and earth sciences project. || 
|-id=618
| 32618 Leungkamcheung ||  || Leungkamcheung (born 1956) is a former president of the Hong Kong Astronomical Society. || 
|-id=621
| 32621 Talcott || 2001 RZ || Richard Talcott (born 1954) joined the staff of Astronomy magazine in early 1986. Since then, he has written hundreds of feature articles on both the science of astronomy and observing the night sky in addition to editing the popular Sky This Month section. Rich also has authored or co-authored several astronomy books. || 
|-id=622
| 32622 Yuewaichun ||  || Yue Wai-Chun (born 1954), a veteran amateur astronomer, was the coordinator of IOTA China division. He had made tremendous contribution to astronomy in numerous ways, including distributing daily astronomy news through Hong Kong Astronomical Society's smart phone apps to tens of thousands of astronomy lovers. || 
|-id=623
| 32623 Samuelkahn ||  || Samuel Bennett Kahn (born 2002), a finalist in the 2016 Broadcom MASTERS, a math and science competition for middle school students, for his environmental and earth sciences project. || 
|-id=628
| 32628 Lazorik ||  || Olivia Jane Lazorik (born 2001), a finalist in the 2016 Broadcom MASTERS, a math and science competition for middle school students, for her animal science project. || 
|-id=630
| 32630 Ethanlevy ||  || Ethan Zvi Levy (born 2002), a finalist in the 2016 Broadcom MASTERS, a math and science competition for middle school students, for his medicine and health sciences project. || 
|-id=631
| 32631 Majzoub ||  || Omar Majzoub (born 2002), a finalist in the 2016 Broadcom MASTERS, a math and science competition for middle school students, for his physics project. || 
|-id=633
| 32633 Honguyang ||  || Hongu Yang (born 1980) is a postdoctoral researcher at Korea Astronomy and Space Science Institute (Daejeon, South Korea). He studies dynamical evolution of dust particles, in particular from comets to the inner solar system. || 
|-id=634
| 32634 Sonjamichaluk ||  || Sonja Morgan Simon Michaluk (born 2003), a finalist in the 2016 Broadcom MASTERS, a math and science competition for middle school students, for her environmental and earth sciences project. || 
|}

32701–32800 

|-id=720
| 32720 Simoeisios || 2131 T-3 || Simoeisios, young Trojan hero killed by Ajax during the Trojan War || 
|-id=724
| 32724 Woerlitz || 4029 T-3 || Gartenreich Dessau-Wörlitz (Garden Kingdom of Dessau-Wörlitz), near Dessau, Germany, an exceptional example of eighteenth-century landscape design and a UNESCO World Heritage site || 
|-id=726
| 32726 Chromios || 4179 T-3 || Chromios, son of Priam, killed by Diomedes during the Trojan War || 
|-id=730
| 32730 Lamarr || 1951 RX || Hedy Lamarr (1914–2000) was an Austrian-American inventor and actress. Along with George Antheil, she developed technology for a radio guidance system to assist the Allied war effort in WWII. These technologies are used in current Bluetooth systems. || 
|-id=731
| 32731 Annaivanovna ||  || Anna Ivanovna Plyugina, specialist in fundamental astrometry at the Pulkovo Observatory || 
|-id=734
| 32734 Kryukov || 1978 RM || Vladimir Vladimirovich Kryukov, Russian electrical engineer || 
|-id=735
| 32735 Strekalov ||  || Gennady Mikhailovich Strekalov (1940–2004), a Russian cosmonaut. || 
|-id=766
| 32766 Voskresenskoe ||  || Voskresenskoe is an urban settlement, the center of the Voskresenskoe region of the Nizhnij Novgorod province and home of the discoverer's parents. The first documented mention of the settlement dates back to 1614. || 
|-id=768
| 32768 Alexandripatov ||  || Alexandr V. Ipatov (born 1945) is the director of the Institute of Applied Astronomy of the Russian Academy of Sciences. || 
|-id=770
| 32770 Starchik ||  || Boris Stepanovich Starchik, Ukrainian engineer, builder, traveller, forester, and defender of nature || 
|-id=776
| 32776 Nriag ||  || National Research Institute of Astronomy and Geophysics (NRIAG), Helwan, Egypt || 
|-id=796
| 32796 Ehrenfest ||  || Paul Ehrenfest, 19th–20th-century Jewish-Austrian physicist || 
|}

32801–32900 

|-id=807
| 32807 Quarenghi ||  || Jacomo Quarenghi, Italian architect, who designed the Hermitage theater, the Smolny Institute, the Guards' Manège (all in St. Petersburg) and the Alexandre Palace (in Tsarskoye Selo) || 
|-id=808
| 32808 Bischoff ||  || Werner Bischoff, researcher at Carl Zeiss, Jena was engaged in designing the large Hamburg || 
|-id=809
| 32809 Sommerfeld ||  || Arnold Sommerfeld, German physics professor || 
|-id=810
| 32810 Steinbach ||  || Manfred Steinbach, professor of precision instrument design for astronomical, geophysical and space applications at Carl Zeiss, Jena || 
|-id=811
| 32811 Apisaon ||  || Apisaon, son of Phausios, Trojan warrior who fought against the approaching Aias but was transfixed and deprived of his armor by Eurypylus || 
|-id=821
| 32821 Posch ||  || Manfred Posch, chief editor of an Austrian newspaper || 
|-id=853
| 32853 Döbereiner ||  || Johann Wolfgang Döbereiner, German professor of chemistry || 
|-id=855
| 32855 Zollitsch ||  || Robert Zollitsch, archbishop of Freiburg || 
|-id=858
| 32858 Kitakamigawa ||  || Kitakamigawa is the largest river in the Tohoku district, flowing from Iwate to Miyagi prefecture. || 
|-id=890
| 32890 Schwob ||  || Pierre R. Schwob (born 1946), American-Swiss software engineer and amateur astronomer || 
|-id=891
| 32891 Amatrice ||  || Amatrice is an Italian mountain village located in the region of Latium. The village, world-famous for the pasta sauce Amatriciana, was destroyed by the earthquake of 2016 August 24. || 
|-id=892
| 32892 Prufrock || 1994 DW || The Love Song of J. Alfred Prufrock and its eponymous narrator known as "Prufrock", a poem by  American-born British poet T. S. Eliot. The poem is often referenced in popular culture. || 
|-id=893
| 32893 van der Waals ||  || Johannes Diderik van der Waals, 19th–20th-century Dutch physicist, thermodynamicist, and Nobelist || 
|-id=897
| 32897 Curtharris || 1994 PD || Curtis Harris, amateur astronomer in Anguilla || 
|-id=899
| 32899 Knigge ||  || Adolph Freiherr Knigge (1752–1796), German author and translator || 
|}

32901–33000 

|-id=911
| 32911 Cervara || 1994 VX || Cervara di Roma, an Italian mountain village located in the Simbruini Regional Park in the region of Latium. || 
|-id=928
| 32928 Xiejialin || 1995 QZ || Xie Jialin (1920–2016), Chinese physicist and member of Chinese Academy of Sciences. || 
|-id=931
| 32931 Ferioli ||  || Luigi Ferioli (born 1938), an Italian amateur astronomer and enthusiastic popularizer of astronomy, a skillful maker of telescopes and sundials, and author of Appunti di ottica astronomica ("Notes on astronomical optics"). || 
|-id=938
| 32938 Ivanopaci ||  || Ivano Paci (born 1932), Italian professor, who provided crucial support to the development of the Pistoia Mountains Astronomical Observatory. || 
|-id=939
| 32939 Nasimi ||  || Imadaddin Nasimi (1369–1417) was a mystical poet who wrote in Azerbaijani, Persian and Arabic. Nasimi wrote two collections of poetry (divans) and a number of poems. In his poetry he expressed both Sufi and Hurufi sentiments. His lyrical and elegant style makes him one of the most prominent early divan masters. || 
|-id=943
| 32943 Sandyryan ||  || Sandy Ryan, American provider of technical support to the AMOS team || 
|-id=944
| 32944 Gussalli ||  || Luigi Gussalli (1885–1950), an Italian mechanical engineer and space-vehicle propulsion designer (Src). || 
|-id=945
| 32945 Lecce ||  || Lecce, in southern Italy, is the capital of the province of Lecce. Because of the rich Baroque architectural monuments found in the city, it is commonly nicknamed "The Florence of the South". The city also has a long traditional affinity with Greek culture going back to its foundation. || 
|-id=969
| 32969 Motohikosato ||  || Motohiko Sato (born 1939) organized the Yamagata Astronomical Society in 1961 and actively popularizes astronomy. || 
|-id=987
| 32987 Uyuni ||  || Salar de Uyuni is by far the largest salty expanse on the planet, located high in the southern Andes of Bolivia || 
|-id=990
| 32990 Sayo-hime ||  || Sayo-hime is the female protagonist of a love story, written around the sixth century, in which a young man heads off to the Korean peninsula. This tragic love story was included in Japan's oldest collection of waka poetry, the Manyohshu. || 
|-id=000
| 33000 Chenjiansheng ||  || Jiansheng Chen (born 1938), a Chinese astrophysicist who contributed to the development of modern astronomy in China. || 
|}

References 

032001-033000